This is a list of all the yachts built by Feadship, sorted by year.

1920–1955

1956–1965

1966–1975

1976–1985

1986–1995

1996–2005

2006–2015

2016–present

Under construction

See also
 List of motor yachts by length
 Luxury yacht
 Feadship

References

Feadship
Built by Feadship
Built by Feadship
Feadship